Petrophile sessilis, known as conesticks, is a species of flowering plant in the family Proteaceae and is endemic to New South Wales. It is an erect shrub with rigid, needle-shaped, divided, sharply-pointed leaves, and oval, spike-like heads of silky-hairy, creamy-yellow flowers.

Description
It can be distinguished from the related Petrophile pulchella by its finely hairy new growth.

Taxonomy
Petrophile sessilis was first formally described in 1827 by Josef August Schultes in the 16th edition of Systema Vegetabilium from an unpublished description by Franz Sieber.

Distribution and habitat
Petrophile sessilis grows on sandstone soils in heath, woodland and forest from the Central Coast to the Central and Southern Tablelands of New South Wales.

References

sessilis
Flora of New South Wales
Plants described in 1827
Taxa named by Josef August Schultes